Native Charger was an American-bred Thoroughbred racehorse and son of Champion Thoroughbred Native Dancer that competed in the 1965 Kentucky Derby and Preakness Stakes after winning two prep races that same year.

Native Charger, like his sire, was a gray, speckled colt bred by Hubert B. Phipps and owned by the Warner Stable of Hollywood film mogul Albert Warner. His dam, Greek Blond, finished in the money in 19 of 25 starts. He was a half-brother to noted sire Raise a Native and Dancer's Image, who crossed the line first in the 1968 Kentucky Derby but was disqualified.

Racing record
Native Charger ran frequently as a 2-year-old with limited success, winning only three times in 13 starts. One of those wins was in the Tyro Stakes at Monmouth Park. Like his sire, he closed quickly over the tiring favorite, Golden Joey, and beat Time Tested by a half length. The time was 1:03 3/5, only one‐fifth of a second slower than the track record.

As a 3-year-old, Native Charger surprised horse racing fans with a win in the Flamingo Stakes, defeating Sparkling Johnny by a half length. Staying in Florida, he repeated his performance by winning the Florida Derby by a neck over Hail To All. His victories thrust him into the Kentucky Derby spotlight, where he was considered one of the favorites behind Bold Lad, but finished second in his final Derby tuneup, the Stepping Stone one week before the Derby. He was blocked by horses in the backstretch and had to angle out to find running room, losing ground. He finished 1 3/4 lengths behind Tom Rolfe.

In the Kentucky Derby, Native Charger was bumped early by Narushua, but recovered and managed to finish fourth behind winner Lucky Debonair. He ran in the Preakness two weeks later, and the result was the same, as he finished fourth, this time behind Tom Rolfe. In uncharacteristic fashion, Native Charger went for the lead early but faded in the stretch. He bowed a tendon in the race, ending his career. He finished the year with two wins, one second and one third in seven starts, and ended his career with 5 wins, 5 seconds and 2 thirds in 20 starts.

Stud record
When he retired, Native Charger stood at Mare Haven Farm in Ocala, Fla. for a fee of $5,000. He sired 1970 American Champion Two-Year-Old Filly Forward Gal and 1970 Belmont Stakes winner High Echelon. He was also damsire of 1982 Preakness Stakes winner Aloma's Ruler.

Pedigree

See also
Native Dancer

References

1962 racehorse births
Racehorses bred in Kentucky
Racehorses trained in the United States
Thoroughbred family 8-h